Castanet-le-Haut is a commune in the Hérault department in southern France.

Geography
The commune is traversed by the rivers Dourdou de Camarès and Mare.

Population

The residents are called Castanetais.

See also
Communes of the Hérault department

References

Communes of Hérault